Kapag Nahati ang Puso (International title: Broken Hearts / ) is a 2018 Philippine television drama romance series broadcast by GMA Network. Directed by Gil Tejada Jr., it stars Bea Binene, Benjamin Alves, and Sunshine Cruz. It premiered on July 16, 2018 on the network's afternoon line up replacing My Guitar Princess. The series concluded on November 2, 2018 with a total of 80 episodes. It was replaced by Woman of Dignity in its timeslot.

The series is originally titled as Karibal Ko ang Aking Ina. It is streaming online on YouTube.

Premise
Rio Matias and Claire del Valle become rivals when they cross paths without knowing their real relationship as biological mother and daughter by coincidence, they both fall in love with Joaquin Espiritu.

Cast and characters

Lead cast
 Bea Binene as Claire del Valle / Gabriella Matias-del Valle
 Benjamin Alves as Joaquin Espiritu
 Sunshine Cruz as Rosario "Rio" Matias-del Valle / Rio Fonacier-del Valle

Supporting cast
 Bing Loyzaga as Miranda Aseron
 David Licauco as Zachary "Zach" Yee
 Zoren Legaspi as Enrico “Nico" del Valle/ Nick” del Valle
 Racquel Villavicencio as Amparo del Valle
 Geleen Eugenio as Delilah
 Nar Cabico as Samson
 Shermaine Santiago as Jasmine
 Jade Lopez as Kat
 Chinggay Riego as Joy
 Tom Olivar as Tonyo
 Rosemarie Sarita as Pilar
 Aaron Yanga as Julius
 Lianne Valentin as Ginger Santillan

Guest cast
 Freddie Webb as Ramon del Valle
 Mia Pangilinan as Sonya
 Lander Vera Perez as Edgar
 Cherry Madrigal as Malou
 Kyle Vergara as Buboy
 Mike Jovida as Ramirez
 Jan Manual as Miggy
 Elle Ramirez as Chloe
 Addy Raj as Hamish Gupta
 Kelley Day as Bernice Manalili
 Divine Aucina as Annie
 Andrew Schimmer as Tope

Ratings
According to AGB Nielsen Philippines' Nationwide Urban Television Audience Measurement People in Television Homes, the final episode of Kapag Nahati ang Puso scored a 7% rating.

References

External links
 
 

2018 Philippine television series debuts
2018 Philippine television series endings
Filipino-language television shows
GMA Network drama series
Philippine romance television series
Television shows set in the Philippines